The 2019 League of Legends Rift Rivals was the third Rift Rivals – a series of cross-regional League of Legends tournaments organised by Riot Games. The tournament was held on 27–29 June 2019 in Los Angeles for the North America and Europe region, and 4–7 July 2019 in Seoul for China, South Korea, Taiwan/Hong Kong/Macau and Vietnam region. The Taiwan/Hong Kong/Macau region and Vietnam region sent their top two teams for Spring season to Rift Rivals 2019 respectively.

Riot Games had discontinued the Rift Rivals event for play-in region this year.

Format

LCS/LEC

 Participants: Top three teams from each region
 Group Stage
 Single Round Robin best of one
 Finals
 Best of five relay race

LCK/LPL/LMS-VCS

 Participants: Top four teams from each region
 LMS-VCS is treated as a single region, each region sends their top two teams for the tournament
 Group Stage
 Best of one
 Each win will attribute to the team's home region
 Top region advances to the finals
 Semifinals
 Best of five
 Each region decides their order for competing
 Winner will advance to the finals
 Finals
 Best of five
 Each region decides their order for competing

Blue Rift (LCS/LEC) 
The 2019 Rift Rival between North America (LCS) - Europe (LEC) featured the top three teams from each region's Spring Split. This event took place in Los Angeles.

 Start date: 27 June 2019
 End date: 29 June 2019
 Patch: 9.12

Red Rift (LCK/LPL/LMS-VCS) 

The 2019 Rift Rival between South Korea (LCK) - China (LPL) - Taiwan/Hong Kong/Macau-Vietnam (LMS-VCS) featured the top four Spring Split teams from each region, except for LMS-VCS which featured the top two Spring Split teams from each region. This event took place in Seoul.

 Start date: 4 July 2019
 End date: 7 July 2019
 Patch: 9.13 (Mordekaiser and Qiyana disabled)

References 

League of Legends competitions
League